The Kapitan Khlebnikov is a Russian (formerly Soviet) icebreaker. The vessel now operates as a cruise ship offering excursions to the Arctic and Antarctic.

History
The Kapitan Khlebnikov was completed in Finland in 1981 as one of four Kapitan Sorokin class icebreakers. She was refitted in 1990 as a tour ship and was the first ship to circumnavigate Antarctica with passengers in 1996–97.

In February 2006 the Kapitan Khlebnikov reached the Bay of Whales in the Antarctic, reaching 78° 40.871' south and equalling the record set by Roald Amundsen in the Fram in 1911.

Construction and layout
 
A polar-class icebreaker, combining power and technology with creature comforts, Kapitan Khlebnikov was originally designed for the rigors of the Arctic Ocean. The vessel has twin decks with superstructure and engine room in the middle, an icebreaker bow and transom stern. The stern region is cushioned to allow for the close towing of other vessels when helping them through the ice.

Passenger accommodation is in 54 cabins and suites, with 2 dining rooms, a lounge and bar. Facilities include a heated indoor swimming pool, exercise room and sauna, theatre-style auditorium and shop. The library has a collection of polar-themed books.

The double hull has water ballast between, with pumps that can move ballast water at up to 74 tonnes a minute to aid ice breaking. Friction between the ship and the ice is reduced by a polymer-paint coating at the level of the ice skirt. An air bubbling system helps ice breaking.

Service

In addition to charters for scientific missions, and for supplying mines and other resource exploitation industries, the vessel is chartered for adventure cruises.

Stuck in the ice
In November 2009, the vessel was trapped in Antarctic ice in a bay near to Snow Hill Island.
The Guardian reports that 101 passengers, mainly United Kingdom citizens, were among the 184 trapped ship's complement. The excursion was called the "Emperor Penguin Safari", and was arranged by an adventure travel firm called "Exodus". Three of the UK passengers were a BBC film crew, working on a documentary, entitled "Frozen Planet". The ship was placed a few days behind schedule but not endangered.

See also
She is one of four large icebreakers operated by the Far East Shipping Company, alongside:
Icebreaker Admiral Makarov
Icebreaker Magadan
Icebreaker Krasin

References

External links

 General information on the Kapitan Khlebnikov at Quark Expeditions
 - Hughes describes his journey on the Kapitan Khlebnikov

Icebreakers of Russia
Icebreakers of the Soviet Union
Expedition cruising
1981 ships
Articles containing video clips